Sofia Reideborn (born 24 March 1999) is a Swedish ice hockey goaltender, currently playing with Göteborg HC of the Swedish Women's Hockey League (SDHL).

Career  
Born in Stockholm, Riedeborn began her career with AIK IF. In 2017, she left the club to join SDE Hockey, where she would take over the starting goalie position. She would go on to play with the club for the next four seasons, including the club's first ever playoff appearance in 2020. 

A self-described "controversial player", Reideborn announced she was stepping back from hockey in July 2020 following a controversial podcast in which she made comments denounced by multiple players as misogynistic and homophobic. In September 2020, she criticised the members of the Swedish national women's football team for expressing support of Black Lives Matter during their European Championship qualifiers.

International   
Riedeborn represented Sweden at the 2015 IIHF World Women's U18 Championship and 2017 IIHF World Women's U18 Championship. In 2019, she criticised the players boycotting the Swedish national team, saying that they should first "show that you are good before making demands". She later made said that she wouldn't want to play in the Swedish national team because she wouldn't be welcomed by the other players.

Personal life   
Her brother, Adam Reideborn, currently plays professionally with HC CSKA Moscow in the KHL.

References

External links 

Swedish women's ice hockey goaltenders
SDE Hockey players
1999 births
Living people
AIK Hockey Dam players
Ice hockey people from Stockholm
Göteborg HC players